2006 Continental Championships may refer to:

African Championships
 Athletics: 2006 African Championships in Athletics
 Football (soccer): 2006 African Cup of Nations

Asian Championships
 Football (soccer): 2006 AFC Women's Asian Cup
 Football (soccer): AFC Champions League 2006
 Multisport: 2006 Asian Games

European Championships
 Athletics: 2006 European Athletics Championships
 Figure Skating: 2006 European Figure Skating Championships
 Football (soccer): 2006–07 UEFA Champions League
 Football (soccer): 2006–07 UEFA Cup
 Football (soccer): 2006 UEFA European Under-17 Football Championship
 Football (soccer): 2006–07 UEFA Women's Cup
 Volleyball: Men's CEV Champions League 2006-07
 Volleyball: Women's CEV Champions League 2006-07

Oceanian Championships
 Football (soccer): Oceania Club Championship 2006
 Swimming: 2006 Oceania Swimming Championships

Pan American Championships / North American Championships
 Football (soccer): CONCACAF Champions' Cup 2006
 Football (soccer): 2006 CONCACAF Women's Gold Cup

South American Championships
 Football (soccer): Copa Libertadores 2006
 Multisport: 2006 South American Games

See also
 2006 World Championships (disambiguation)
 2006 World Junior Championships (disambiguation)
 2006 World Cup (disambiguation)
 Continental championship (disambiguation)

 Continental championships